is a 2005 video game developed by Racjin for the Nintendo DS. It was released by Hudson Soft in Japan on May 26, 2005, and published worldwide by Ubisoft. The game is notable for its chibi art style, previously seen in the Bomberman Land series. 

Part of the Bomberman franchise, it is the first entry to be released on the platform. A sequel, Bomberman 2, was released in 2008.

Gameplay

The single player mode features are 10 levels with 10 stages each, a bonus stage after the 5th stage, and a boss battle for the 10th stage.  
A new mechanic is the item screen. All items collected are added to a stock. Using the touch screen, you can use the items to power Bomberman up; thus, if you die, you can use your reserve items to restart at full power instead of with no power.

The multiplayer mode uses the touch screen to expand the playing area, with tunnels connecting the two screens. Some arenas make use of the microphone to do certain things like setting off remote bombs and using the shield. The revenge bomb setting adds a whole new level to multiplayer gameplay by allowing a player to throw bombs after they are eliminated from the game by flicking them off the touch screen with the stylus. If Super Revenge mode is activated, if a player blows up another player using a flicked Revenge bomb, the player respawns where their opponent fell.

Bomberman is one of many games on the Nintendo DS which allows a player without a copy of the game to participate. Players are able to temporarily download a full copy of the multiplayer game from someone who has the game.

Reception

The game received "generally favorable reviews" according to the review aggregation website Metacritic. In Japan, however, Famitsu gave it a score of 26 out of 40.

Notes

References

External links
Official Site (Japanese)
Ubisoft - Bomberman

Ubisoft blasts off Hudson's new and improved Bomberman in Europe and North America

2005 video games
Action video games
Bomberman
Hudson Soft games
Multiplayer and single-player video games
Nintendo DS games
Nintendo DS-only games
Puzzle video games
Ubisoft games
Video games developed in Japan